The Lo Nuestro Award for Tropical Salsa Female Artist of the Year (or Tropical Female Artist of the Year) is an honor presented annually by American network Univision. The Lo Nuestro Awards were first awarded in 1989 and has been given annually since to recognize the most talented performers of Latin music. The nominees and winners were originally selected by a voting poll conducted among program directors of Spanish-language radio stations in the United States and also based on chart performance on Billboard Latin music charts, with the results being tabulated and certified by the accounting firm Deloitte. At the present time, the winners are selected by the audience through an online survey. The trophy awarded is shaped in the form of a treble clef. This category originally was awarded as Tropical Salsa Artist of the Year (1989-1992), and from 1993 onwards was separated as Female Artist of the Year and Male Artist of the Year.

The award was first presented to Dominican singer Angela Carrasco in 1993. Puerto-Rican American performer Olga Tañón holds the record for the most awards with 13, out of seventeen nominations. Tañón also has become the most awarded in Lo Nuestro Awards history, with 25 accolades. Cuban singers Celia Cruz and Gloria Estefan, awarded three and two times, respectively, are the only multiple winners beside Tañón. Puerto-Rican singer India is the most nominated performer without a win, with 12 unsuccessful nominations.

Winners and nominees
Listed below are the winners of the award and the nominees for each year.

See also

 List of music awards honoring women

References

Tropical Female Artist of the Year
Music awards honoring women
Tropical musicians
Awards established in 1993